Opel Automobile is a German car manufacturer.

Opel may also refer to:
 OPEL Networks, a former Australian telecommunications provider
 Opel (album), an album by musician Syd Barrett

People
Adam Opel  (1837–1895), founder of Opel, the company
Fritz von Opel (1899–1971), German automotive engineer
Jackie Opel  (1938–1970), Barbadian singer
John R. Opel (1925–2011), U.S. computer businessman
Nancy Opel (born c. 1957), American singer, actress, and teacher
Rikky von Opel (born 1947), Liechtenstein racing driver
Robert Opel (1939–1979), American photographer
Wilhelm von Opel (1871–1948), co-founder of Opel